Parsabad County is in Ardabil province, Iran. The capital of the county is the city of Parsabad. At the 2006 census, the county's population was 164,576 in 34,456 households. The following census in 2011 counted 173,182 people in 44,035 households. At the 2016 census, the county's population was 177,601 in 50,083 households. Aslan Duz District was separated from the county in 2018 to form Aslan Duz County.

Administrative divisions

The population history and structural changes of Parsabad County's administrative divisions over three consecutive censuses are shown in the following table. The latest census shows four districts, eight rural districts, and four cities.

References

 

Counties of Ardabil Province